Hiroden-hatsukaichi is a Hiroden station on Hiroden Miyajima Line, located in Hatsukaichi, Hatsukaichi, Hiroshima.

Routes
From Hiroden-hatsukaichi Station, there is one of Hiroden Streetcar routes.
 Hiroshima Station - Hiroden-miyajima-guchi Route

Connections
█ Miyajima Line

Sanyo-joshidai-mae — Hiroden-hatsukaichi — Hatsukaichi-shiyakusyo-mae (Hera)

Other services connections

JR lines
JR lines connections at JR Hatsukaichi Station

Around station
JR Hatsukaichi Station
Hiroden Hatsukaichi Transformer Substation

History
Opened as "Hatsukaichi-cho" on April 6, 1924.
Renamed to "Densya-hatsukaichi" on February 1, 1931.
Renamed to "Hiroden-hatsukaichi" on June 1, 1961.
Stopped the shuttle service during the morning rush hour since August 31, 1998.
Closed the station office on December 30, 2005.

See also
Hiroden Streetcar Lines and Routes

References 

Hiroden Miyajima Line stations
Railway stations in Japan opened in 1924